Ballylanders fort  is a ringfort (rath) and National Monument located in County Limerick, Ireland.

Location

Ballylanders fort is located 1 km (1,100 yd) north of Ballylanders town.

Description

Ballylanders fort is a univallate rath, with two outer rings visible as cropmarks. The remains of a fulacht fiadh are nearby.

References

Archaeological sites in County Limerick
National Monuments in County Limerick